Al-Tanf, also known as the Al-Tanf garrison (ATG), is a United States military base within territory controlled by the Syrian opposition in Homs Governorate, Syria.  It is located 24 km (15 mi) west of the al-Tanf border crossing in the Syrian Desert. The surrounding deconfliction zone is located along the Iraq and Jordan–Syria border. The garrison is located along a critical road known as the M2 Baghdad–Damascus Highway.

A significant United States Armed Forces presence at the outpost began in early 2016 during the American-led intervention in the Syrian Civil War in order to train anti-Islamic State fighters of the New Syrian Army rebel group, which was dissolved and reemerged as the Revolutionary Commando Army (Maghawir al-Thawra) in December 2016.

The government of Syria deems the U.S. military presence in al-Tanf illegal and "considers the presence of Turkish and US troops on its territory as an aggression and demands immediate and unconditional withdrawal of foreign forces from its territory."
The Iranian and Russian governments have publicly supported the Syrian government's position and have regularly criticized the American presence in southeastern Syria whereas the United States government states that its presence at al-Tanf is legal.
The U.S. has called the al-Tanf base a counter to the Russia–Syria–Iran coalition's residual influence in the area.

The Rukban refugee camp for internally displaced Syrians is located within the deconfliction zone.

History of operations and combat

In May 2015, Islamic State militants captured the border checkpoint at Al-Tanf, thus obtaining control over the full length of the Iraq–Syria border. The U.S.-backed New Syrian Army rebel faction captured the al-Tanf post on the Syrian side of the border in early March 2016, and in early August, the al-Waleed checkpoint on the Iraqi side of the border was recaptured by pro-government Iraqi tribal militias backed by U.S.-led forces. In August 2016, the BBC published photographs taken in June that year which it said showed British special forces soldiers apparently guarding the perimeter of the al-Tanf base. In March 2017, the Revolutionary Commando Army (the successor of the New Syrian Army) re-opened the border crossing, resuming cross-border civilian traffic; a group referred to as the Army of Iraqi Tribes was said to control the Iraqi side of the crossing.

On 8 April 2017, ISIL fighters launched a complex and coordinated attack against the U.S. special forces outpost at al-Tanf. ISIL started the attack by striking the base with a car bomb and then attacking with ~50 infantry. The attack was repelled first by gunfire from the rebels and Norwegian  and U.S. special forces, then by multiple airstrikes from the anti-ISIL coalition which killed most of the ISIL force and destroyed their vehicles. Rebels stated that four of their fighters and eight ISIL fighters were killed.

On 18 May 2017, U.S. fighter jets struck a convoy of pro-Syrian government forces advancing towards the base. Shortly thereafter, Syrian government forces were reported to continue their advance in a direction the government forces appeared to use advanced Russian-made weapons and were supported by Russian helicopters, according to a report acknowledged on May 26 by the Russian Defence Ministry′s media outlet.

On 17 June 2017, the Iraqi Armed Forces announced that the Iraqi Army and Sunni tribal fighters, supported by U.S.-led Coalition aircraft, had dislodged ISIL from the Iraqi side of al-Waleed border crossing.

At the end of December 2017, the chief of the Russian General Staff Valery Gerasimov said that the U.S. garrison at al-Tanf was fully isolated by Syrian government forces following the desert offensive in the area.

Around 16 February 2020, an Iranian-backed proxy group reportedly breached the deconfliction zone at Al-Tanf, and were then repelled by Maghawir al-Thawra.

On 20 October 2021, the base was attacked by drones, causing no injuries. On 14 December 2021, a RAF Typhoon FGR4 shot down a small hostile drone with an ASRAAM near the base.

In June 2022, Russia carried out airstrikes at the al-Tanf garrison U.S. military base, after first notifying the United States of their intentions. U.S. officials said that Russia claimed the Maghawir al-Thawra group had carried out a roadside bomb attack on Russian forces, though the United States does not believe this, and instead believes Russia was just looking for a reason to carry out the airstrikes in the location.

The United States reported a drone attack in the vicinity of the al-Tanf base on the night of 15 August 2022. All but one of the drones were repelled and despite a single drone detonating in a compound used by Maghaweir al-Thowra, the attack did not result in any casualties or damage. Shortly thereafter, the Syrian Foreign Ministry released a statement demanding that "the American side must immediately and unconditionally withdraw its military forces that are present on the territory of Syria illegally".

On 24 August 2022, U.S. President Joe Biden ordered airstrikes against claimed Islamic Revolutionary Guard Corps after a number of rockets struck near the U.S. military base in al-Tanf on 15 August and an airstrike by the Russian military in an area held by the Syrian opposition. The U.S. strikes targeted eleven bunkers in Deir ez-Zor used to store weapons, according to the United States Central Command. A spokesperson for the Iranian foreign ministry denies that Iran has any link to targets hit by U.S. in Syria and condemns the strike as "a violation of Syria's sovereignty and territorial integrity".

"The 55 km area"

By late 2017, Arab media began calling the "deconfliction area" around the Tanf base "the 55 km area" as it composed of a half-circle area with a radius of 55 km with the base at its center. By 2018, the al-Tanf area hosted five rebel factions including the Lions of the East Army, the Forces of Martyr Ahmad al-Abdo, the Army of Free Tribes, the Revolutionary Commando Army (also known as Maghawir al-Thawra (MaT)), and Al-Qaryatayn Martyrs Brigade.

On 7 September 2018, United States Central Command announced an Operation Inherent Resolve live fire exercise around the al-Tanf garrison, named Operation Apex Teufelhunden. The announcement described it as a "defeat-ISIS exercise". The Russian Reconciliation Center for Syria commented that "during the existence of the base, we don't know of a single US operation against IS [Islamic State, formerly ISIS] in the area."

On 23 October 2019, Maghawir al-Thawra reportedly seized $3.5 million worth of illicit drugs from a smuggler within the DCZ. According to CJTF-OIR, the smuggler hid the drugs under the normal guise of supplies being transported to the Rukban refugee camp. MaT searched the smuggler's truck and found nearly 850,000 Captagon pills. "This is one of the biggest drug busts we have ever had," said Col. Muhanned Tallah, the MaT commander. The coalition linked weapons and drug smuggling within the DCZ to ISIL underground networks.

On 16 April 2020, a number of Syrian rebels at al-Tanf base defected to the Syrian government in a convoy.

On 30 May 2020, the U.S. military published images of special operations forces personnel at al-Tanf training with an advanced Israeli-made Smart Shooter SMASH 2000 "smart" optical sighting system attached to their M4A1 rifles. It remained unclear if special operations units in the region had actually adopted the computerized optic or if the training was part of field trials or another type of demonstration.

Official statements on the base

The U.S. refers to the Revolutionary Commando Army as part of the "Vetted Syrian Opposition". According to the U.S., these fighters are permitted only to launch offensives against ISIL and not against the Syrian Armed Forces, though clashes with pro-Syrian government elements have occurred. By 2019, the CJTF-OIR coalition referred to the area simply as the Deconfliction Zone (DCZ) with the Al-Tanf Garrison (ATG) at the center.

In September 2017, Russian government-owned media outlet RIA Novosti reported, with a reference to unnamed military and diplomatic sources, that the U.S. had voiced readiness to leave al-Tanf but did not say when.

On 8 February 2018, following "an unprovoked attack" by the pro-Syrian government forces in eastern Syria, the Syrian Democratic Forces and U.S.-led Coalition inflicted multiple casualties among Russian private military contractors of the Wagner Group, the Russian foreign ministry spokesperson, Maria Zakharova said: "The unlawful US armed presence in Syria presents a serious challenge to the peace process and to the country's territorial integrity and unity. A 55-kilometer zone unilaterally created by Americans around their military base near al-Tanf is being used by the scattered units of ISIS militants" for evading pursuit by government forces and re-grouping. In mid-February 2018, Russia's foreign minister Sergey Lavrov, in an exclusive interview with Euronews, said that U.S. military presence in Syria generally and in the area of al-Tanf specifically "was illegal and unacceptable."

In August 2018, U.S. State Department representative William V. Roebuck traveled to the cities of Manbij and Kobanî, both situated in Aleppo Governorate, as well as the town of al-Shaddadah in Hasakah Governorate. He was later due to visit Deir ez-Zor Governorate, half of which is held by the Kurdish-led Democratic Federation of Northern Syria. "We are prepared to stay here, as the president Donald Trump has made clear," he said after meeting with Kurdish officials.

In October 2018, General Joseph Votel, commander of United States Central Command, stated that U.S. forces in al-Tanf did not "have a counter Iranian mission here. We have a defeat ISIS mission," but nevertheless acknowledged that American presence in the area had "an indirect effect on some malign activities that Iran and their various proxies and surrogates would like to pursue down here."

After the announced withdrawal of U.S. troops from Syria, U.S. National Security Advisor John Bolton said in early 2019 that U.S. operations in the al-Tanf area would continue as a part of the U.S. effort to counter "Iranian influence" in Syria. On 28 January 2019, Jordanian Foreign Minister Ayman Safadi ruled out the prospect of Jordanian forces seizing control of al-Tanf after American ground troops leave Syria. "Al-Tanf is on the other side of the Jordanian border. As I said, Jordan will not cross its border. We will take every measure we have to protect our security...but arrangements on the other side of the border after withdrawal will have to be agreed by all parties, and they have to ensure the safety and security in the area," Safadi said.

The Trump administration announced on 22 February 2019 that around 400 U.S. troops would remain in Syria post-withdrawal, with about half garrisoned in the Democratic Federation of Northern Syria and half at the al-Tanf garrison. The 200 at al-Tanf were to remain indefinitely.

On 27 February, Syria and Russia released a joint statement again demanding all U.S. forces leave Syria, while also demanding U.S. forces allow Russian and Syrian authorities to evacuate the Rukban refugee camp along the Jordanian border to "relocate people in the Rubkan area and guarantee them safe passage to their places of permanent residence". Russia argued that the U.S. was holding the refugee camp "hostage" and potentially as human shields within the territory. According to a 24 March report by the U.S. government-funded Voice of America, the U.S.-backed Revolutionary Commando Army rebel group, which maintains aid access and provides security for the Rukban camp, said both refugees and U.S.-backed rebels in the zone depended on U.S. protection against attacks by pro-Syrian government militias and Islamic State-affiliated jihadists. A Rukban camp spokesman asserted that it was the Syrians and Russians that were "embargoing" the camp to force the refugees into reconciliation and to pressure U.S. troops to leave the strategically important al-Tanf military base.

On 4 June 2019, representatives of more than 30 countries participated in a meeting with the command of Operation Inherent Resolve in Kuwait where the issue of stepping up efforts to fight terrorism in Iraq and Syria was discussed. Amid a period of heightened regional tensions with Iran, the Pentagon announced on 18 June that another 1,000 troops will be deployed to the Middle East, presumably including the U.S. base in Syrian al-Tanf.

In October 2019, in the context of the pullout of American troops from northern Syria, The New York Times reported that the Pentagon was planning to "leave 150 Special Operations forces at a base called al-Tanf".

In 2021 it was reported that, according to "Israeli defense sources", al-Tanf continued to host around 350 military personnel and civilians, "including some British and French forces that were described as 'intelligence experts'".

In August 2022, CNN reported that there are approximately 900 US troops in Syria, with most of them split between the al-Tanf base and Syria's eastern oil fields.

See also

 List of United States military bases in Syria
 American-led intervention in the Syrian Civil War
 Foreign interventions by the United States
 Timber Sycamore

References



External links

 Video 

American involvement in the Syrian civil war
Military facilities of the United States in Syria
Homs Governorate in the Syrian civil war